The inferior rectal artery (inferior hemorrhoidal artery) is an artery that supplies blood to the lower third of the anal canal below the pectinate line.

Structure
The inferior rectal artery arises from the internal pudendal artery as it passes above the ischial tuberosity.

Piercing the wall of the pudendal canal, it divides into two or three branches which cross the ischioanal fossa, and are distributed to the muscles and integument of the anal region, and send offshoots around the lower edge of the gluteus maximus to the skin of the buttock.

They anastomose with the corresponding vessels of the opposite side, with the superior and middle rectal arteries, and with the perineal artery.

Function 
The inferior rectal artery supplies oxygenated blood to the anal sphincter and the lower third of the anal canal below the pectinate line.

Additional images

See also
 Superior rectal artery
 Middle rectal artery
 Inferior rectal nerve

References

External links
  - "Inferior view of female perineum, branches of the internal pudendal artery."
  - "Branches of internal pudendal artery in the male perineum."
 
 
 
 
 

Arteries of the abdomen